National Route 19 ( [QL19] or ) runs across Vietnam roughly in line with the 14th parallel north. The route includes two segments: National Route 19 begins at Qui Nhơn and ends just short of the Vietnam-Cambodia border, while National Route 19B begins on the Qui Nhơn peninsula and joins Route 1 east of Phu Cat Airport.

Route description
National Route 19 runs through the following towns and cities:
northwest of Qui Nhơn where it connects with Route 1
An Khê District
Pleiku, where it connects to Route 17 
southwest of Pleiku, where it connects to Route 14C

History
Route Coloniale 19 or RC19 was constructed by the French in the early 20th century and was the main road connecting the Central Highlands with the coastal region of Vietnam.

The Battle of Mang Yang Pass took place along RC19 between An Khê and Pleiku from 24–30 June 1954.

In the early 1960s as the Vietnam War began to increase in intensity, the Army of the Republic of Vietnam (ARVN) and US Special Forces began to build a chain of bases in the Central Highlands to interdict the flow of men and material from North Vietnam. In August 1965 the 1st Cavalry Division established Camp Radcliff at An Khê. Route 19 became a vital supply artery to these bases and the Vietcong and North Vietnamese Army (NVA) conducted frequent ambushes along the road.

As part of the Battle of Ban Me Thuot in March 1975, the NVA blocked Route 19 preventing the movement of ARVN reinforcements towards Pleiku and preventing its use in the subsequent evacuation of the Central Highlands.

References

19
Vietnam War sites